Gaebelein may refer to:

 Arno C. Gaebelein (1861–1945), early dispensationalist leader and contributing author to The Fundamentals
 Arthur Gaebelein (1891–1964), German international footballer
 Frank E. Gaebelein (1899–1983), founder of the Stony Brook School and editor of the Expositor's Bible Commentary